Bont Newydd railway station (sometimes shown as Bontnewydd) in Gwynedd, Wales, was a station on the now-closed Ruabon to Barmouth line.

Originally a single-line station, a crossing loop was installed in 1923 and a second platform constructed out of old sleepers. A corrugated iron shelter was provided on the Down platform. The main station building was on the Up platform and contained a booking office, general waiting room, ladies room and Gents WC.

There was a siding on the up side capable of holding fifteen wagons. A signal box controlled the single-line sections to Dolgellau in one direction and Drws-y-Nant in the other. The box also controlled the adjacent level crossing. Today, the brick platform remains. The station-master's house across the road remains and is still occupied.

According to the Official Handbook of Stations the following classes of traffic were being handled at this station in 1956: G & P and there was no crane.

Neighbouring stations

References

Further reading

External links
 Bont Newydd station on navigable 1946 O.S. map

Disused railway stations in Gwynedd
Beeching closures in Wales
Railway stations in Great Britain opened in 1868
Railway stations in Great Britain closed in 1965
1868 establishments in Wales
Brithdir and Llanfachreth
Former Great Western Railway stations